Øystein Langholm Hansen (born 4 August 1957) is a Norwegian trade unionist and politician for the Labour Party.

In the 2013 election he was elected as a deputy representative to the Parliament of Norway from Rogaland.

References

1957 births
Living people
People from Strand, Norway
Norwegian trade unionists
Labour Party (Norway) politicians
Rogaland politicians
Deputy members of the Storting